The Academy of Country Music Award for New Male Artist of the Year is one of the new artist categories presented at the Academy of Country Music Awards. This award was first awarded in 1966 to Merle Haggard, when this award was known as the Most Promising Male Vocalist.

From 1966 to 1977, this award was known as the Most Promising Male Vocalist. 

From 1978 to 2008, the award was known as the Top New Male Vocalist. 

And from 2016 to now, this award is now known as the New Male Artist of the Year. 

This award is given to the new male artist who has gained initial fame or significantly greater recognition during the promotion of a debut or sophomore album within the eligibility period. The artist must have released a single that reached the Top 40 on Billboard’s Hot Country Songs or the Mediabase Country charts. Any albums self-released through an independent label the artist owns and operates may not be counted as a debut or sophomore album, unless it produces a Top 40 single reported by Billboard’s Hot Country Songs or Mediabase Country charts.

Winners and nominees 
In the following tables, the years correspond to the date of the ceremony. Artists are eligible based on their work of the previous calendar year. Entries with a blue ribbon next to the artist's name have won the award; those with a white background are the nominees on the short-list.

There was no winner for this award in 2004, 2005, and from 2009-2015. For the award was changed into the Top New Artist of the Year award.

References 

Country music awards
Academy of Country Music Awards